Anthocleista microphylla is a species of plant in the family Gentianaceae. It is found in Cameroon, Equatorial Guinea, Ghana, Nigeria, and São Tomé and Príncipe. Its natural habitat is subtropical or tropical moist lowland forests. It is threatened by habitat loss.

References

microphylla
Flora of Cameroon
Flora of Equatorial Guinea
Flora of Ghana
Flora of Nigeria
Flora of São Tomé Island
Flora of Príncipe
Taxonomy articles created by Polbot
Taxa named by Herbert Fuller Wernham